An aerial bomb is a type of explosive or incendiary weapon intended to travel through the air on a predictable trajectory. Engineers usually develop such bombs to be dropped from an aircraft.

The use of aerial bombs is termed aerial bombing.

Bomb types 
Aerial bombs include a vast range and complexity of designs. These include unguided gravity bombs, guided bombs, bombs hand-tossed from a vehicle, bombs needing a large specially-built delivery-vehicle, bombs integrated with the vehicle itself (such as a glide bomb), instant-detonation bombs, or delay-action bombs.

As with other types of explosive weapons, aerial bombs aim to kill and injure people or to destroy materiel through the projection of one or more of blast, fragmentation, radiation or fire outwards from the point of detonation.

Early bombs 

The first bombs delivered to their targets by air were single bombs carried on unmanned hot air balloons, launched by the Austrians against Venice in 1849 during the First Italian War of Independence.

The first bombs dropped from a heavier-than-air aircraft were grenades or grenade-like devices. Historically, the first use was by Giulio Gavotti on 1 November 1911, during the Italo-Turkish War.

In 1912, during the First Balkan War, Bulgarian Air Force pilot Christo Toprakchiev suggested the use of aircraft to drop "bombs" (called grenades in the Bulgarian army at this time) on Turkish positions. Captain Simeon Petrov developed the idea and created several prototypes by adapting different types of grenades and increasing their payload.

On 16 October 1912, observer Prodan Tarakchiev dropped two of those bombs on the Turkish railway station of Karağaç (near the besieged Edirne) from an Albatros F.2 aircraft piloted by Radul Milkov, for the first time in this campaign.

Technical description

Aerial bombs typically use a contact fuze to detonate the bomb upon impact, or a delayed-action fuze initiated by impact.

Reliability
Not all bombs dropped detonate; failures are common. It was estimated that during the Second World War about 10% of German bombs failed to detonate, and that Allied bombs had a failure rate of 15% or 20%, especially if they hit soft soil and used a pistol-type detonating mechanism rather than fuzes. A great many bombs were dropped during the war; thousands of unexploded bombs which may be able to detonate are discovered every year, particularly in Germany, and have to be defused or detonated in a controlled explosion, in some cases requiring evacuation of thousands of people beforehand. Old bombs occasionally detonate when disturbed, or when a faulty time fuze eventually functions, showing that precautions are still essential when dealing with them.

See also
 Aerial bombing of cities
 Area bombardment
 Bomber
 Explosive weapons
 Strategic bombing
 Tactical bombing

Types of aerial bomb
 Cluster bomb 
 Concrete bomb
 Earthquake bomb
 Incendiary bomb
 General-purpose bomb
 Gravity (dumb) bomb
 Guided (smart) bomb
 Nuclear Bomb

References

External links 
"bomb" at Encyclopædia Britannica

 
 
Explosive weapons